Big White may refer to:
Big White Mountain, mountain in British Columbia, Canada
Big White Ski Resort, ski resort in British Columbia, Canada
Big whites, upper-class colonists in French Saint-Domingue
Sheheke (1766–1812), Mandan chief also known as Big White

See also
Big White Fog, play written by Theodore Ward
Large white, species of butterfly
Large White pig, British breed of pig
The Big White, 2005 film